Musa al-Alami (Arabic: موسى العلمي) was mayor of Jerusalem in the 19th century.

His son, Faidi al-Alami, was also mayor of the city and his grandson, another Musa al-Alami, was assistant attorney-general of Palestine under the British mandate.

References

Arabs in Ottoman Palestine
Year of birth missing
Year of death missing
Palestinian politicians
Mayors of Jerusalem
19th-century people from the Ottoman Empire
19th-century politicians
19th-century Arabs